St James Park railway station is a suburban railway station in Exeter, Devon, England. The station is adjacent to the Exeter City football ground. Great Western Railway manage the station and operate the train services.

History
A small station named Lion's Holt Halt was opened in the cutting west of Blackboy Tunnel on 26 January 1906.  Mount Pleasant Road Halt was opened at the same time to the east of the tunnel but was closed in 1928.

The name of Lion's Holt was changed to St James Park on 7 October 1946, the name of the Exeter City F.C. football ground, which is next to the station. The club has adopted the station under the community railways scheme and contributes to its upkeep.

Tarka line services from Barnstaple terminated at St James Park from December 2018, reversing in the siding at Exmouth Junction before returning. In the May 2021 timetable they terminate at Exeter Central but will still run through St James Park when they reverse in the siding at Exmouth Junction.

Description
There are two platforms. Platform 2 (for trains toward Exmouth) was originally very short (about ) and could only be served by a one  coach trains. Longer trains had to use selective door opening or single door opening. Works took place in October 2020 to extend platform 1 by 10 metres and platform 2 by 49 metres.

Services

South Western Railway services between London Waterloo and Exeter St Davids pass through the station but do not stop; passengers for this route have to change at Exeter Central.

References

External links

Railway stations in Exeter
Former London and South Western Railway stations
Railway stations in Great Britain opened in 1906
Railway stations served by Great Western Railway
DfT Category F2 stations